Liujiaping Township is an rural township in Sangzhi County, Zhangjiajie, Hunan Province, China.

Administrative division
The township is divided into 13 villages, the following areas: Yingzishan Village, Shuangxiqiao Village, Gaojiaping Village,  Village, Tangjiaqiao Village, Zhujita Village, Shuangyuanping Village, Xiongjiawan Village, Liujiaping Village, Tian'erya Village, Chaoyangdi Village, Xinqiao Village, Guanxijian Village, and Wantianyu Village (英子山村、双溪桥村、高家坪村、唐家桥村、朱机塔村、双元坪村、熊家湾村、刘家坪村、田儿亚村、朝阳地村、新桥村、关溪涧村、晚田峪村).

References

External links

Divisions of Sangzhi County
Ethnic townships of the People's Republic of China